The 2009–10 Gamma Ethniki was the 27th season since the official establishment of the third tier of Greek football in 1983. It started on September 11, 2009 and finished on May 16, 2010.

Southern Group

League table

Northern Group

League table

Play-off match

References

Third level Greek football league seasons
3
Greece